Johannes Georg Forchhammer (22 May 1861 – 23 July 1938) was a Danish physicist and educator.

He was born in Aalborg as a son of Johannes Nicolai Georg Forchhammer. He was a brother of teacher Henni Forchhammer and singer Viggo Forchhammer and uncle of theatre director Bjarne Forchhammer. He was a grandson of Johan Georg Forchhammer and grandnephew of August Friedrich Wilhelm Forchhammer.

He finished his secondary education at Herlufsholm School in 1880, and took the polytechnical examination in chemistry in 1885. He was an assistant at the Carlsberg Laboratory from 1885 to 1886, and from 1886 to 1891 he taught at the Metropolitan School and the Royal Danish Naval Academy. On 1 April 1891 he became manager of the school for deaf people in Nyborg. School textbooks written by Forchhammer include Mekanisk Fysik (1888) and Astronomi (1889) together with Julius Petersen. He took the dr.philos. degree in 1903 with the thesis Om nødvendigheden af sikre meddelelsesmidler i døvstummeundervisningen. From 1909 to 1926 he headed the Royal Institute for the deaf-mute in Fredericia. He died in 1938.

References

External links
 

1861 births
1938 deaths
People from Aalborg
Danish physicists
Danish educators
Rectors of the University of Copenhagen